Walter Stefaan Karel van den Broeck (born 28 March 1941 in Olen) is a Belgian writer and playwright. He graduated as a teacher in Dutch and History (Lier), and he started his career as a teacher.

In 1974 he resigned as a teacher and became chief editor of Turnhout Ekspres, and since 1979 he is a member of the editorial team of the Nieuw Vlaams Tijdschrift.

He became well known through his play Groenten uit Balen and the novel Brief aan Boudewijn, which was succeeded by the tetralogy Het beleg van Laken.

In 2010 he wrote the script for a comic book by Reinhart.

Bibliography
De troonopvolger (1967)
Lang weekend (1968)
1 cola met 6 rietjes (1969)
362.880 x Jef Geys (1970)
Mietje Porselein en Lili Spring-in-'t Veld (1970)
Groenten uit Balen (1972)
In beslag genomen. Een politiek-erotische satire (1972)
Mazelen (1972)
De dag dat Lester Saigon kwam (1974)
Een andere Vermeer (1974)
Greenwich (1974)
Aantekeningen van een stambewaarder (1977)
De rekening van het kind (1977)
Het wemelbed (1978)
Tot nut van 't Algemeen (1979)
Brief aan Boudewijn (1980)
Au bouillon belge (1981)
Het beleg van Laken (1985)
Aangewaaid (1986)
¡Querido hermano! (1988)
Gek leven na het bal! (1989)
Het proces Xhenceval (1990)
Het gevallen baken (1991)
Het leven na beklag (1992)
Amanda en de widowmaker (1994)
Verdwaalde post (1998)
Een lichtgevoelige jongen (2001)
Troïka voor spoken (met Frans Depeuter en Robin Hannelore, 1970)
Tien jaar later (Nieuw Vlaams Tijdschrift-cahier, 1982)

Awards
1972 - Beste kinderboek van de provincie Antwerpen
1973 - Letterkundige prijs van de provincie Antwerpen
1981 - Sabamprijs
1981 - Dirk Martens prijs
1982 - Henriëtte Roland Holst prijs
1982 - Driejaarlijkse Staatsprijs voor Toneel
1992 - Belgische Staatsprijs voor Vlaams verhalend proza

See also
Flemish literature

Sources

References
Walter van den Broeck
Walter van den Broeck
Willem M. Roggeman, 'Walter van den Broeck' In: Beroepsgeheim 4 (1983)

1941 births
Flemish writers
Belgian writers
Belgian male novelists
Belgian comics writers
Belgian dramatists and playwrights
Belgian male dramatists and playwrights
Living people